The 1952 Los Angeles State Diablos football team represented Los Angeles State College—now known as California State University, Los Angeles—as a member of the California Collegiate Athletic Association (CCAA) during the 1952 college football season. Led by second-year head coach Leonard Adams, Los Angeles State compiled an overall record of 4–4 with a mark of 1–3 in conference play, placing fourth in the CCAA. The Diablos played home games at Los Angeles State Field in Los Angeles.

Schedule

Notes

References

Los Angeles State
Cal State Los Angeles Diablos football seasons
Los Angeles State Diablos football